Richard Bernard Moore (born February 20, 1965) is an American man on death row in South Carolina. He was convicted of the September 1999 murder of James Mahoney, a convenience store clerk, in Spartanburg, South Carolina. Moore's case received international attention when he was scheduled for execution and opted to be executed by firing squad under the state's new controversial capital punishment laws. Moore was set to become the first person to be executed in South Carolina in over a decade, as well as the first person in the state to be executed via firing squad. However, his execution was stayed by the South Carolina Supreme Court on April 20, 2022.

Early life
Moore was born on February 20, 1965, and grew up in Michigan. He struggled with drug addiction and turned to robbery to support his drug habit. In the 1980s, he was convicted of burglary and weapons charges. In 1991, he moved with his partner, Lynda Byrd, from Michigan to Spartanburg, South Carolina. The two later had two children together.

In 1991, Moore punched Michelle Crowder in the neck while trying to steal her purse in Spartanburg, then kicked her repeatedly in the head and back after she fell on the purse. When Crowder's fiancé came to help her, Moore beat the man so severely that he had to be hospitalized. Crowder would later testify at the sentencing phase of Moore's murder trial.

Another Spartanburg resident, Valerie Wisniewski, said that Moore robbed her as she was working in a shoe store. In 1997, Moore also pleaded guilty to assault and battery of a high and aggravated nature for attacking a woman.

Crime
On September 16, 1999, in the early hours, Moore entered Nikki's convenience store in Spartanburg. He was unarmed and was intending to rob the store to support his cocaine addiction. Inside the store was the clerk, 42-year-old James Mahoney, and an eyewitness to the crime, Terry Hadden. As Hadden played on a video poker machine, he saw Moore walk toward the cooler inside the store. He then heard Mahoney shout at Moore and ask him what he was doing. Hadden turned to see Moore and Mahoney in a brawl, with Moore holding both of Mahoney's hands with just one of his. Mahoney had pulled a gun on Moore and the two got into a scuffle, with Moore taking hold of the weapon with his other hand. Moore turned his attention to Hadden and pointed the gun at him, telling him not to move.

Moore then tried to shoot Hadden, but missed. Hadden fell to the floor, pretending to be dead. Mahoney then pulled out a second gun and several more shots were fired. Mahoney shot Moore in the arm while Moore shot Mahoney in the chest. After Moore paced around the store leaving a trail of blood behind him, he fled the store and drove off in his pickup truck. Hadden then got up and saw Mahoney lying face down on the floor, with a gun lying near his hand. Hadden called the police but Mahoney died minutes later from the gunshot wound to the chest. Moore stole $1,408 from the store.

After Moore left the store, Deputy Bobby Rollins, who was on the lookout for him, heard a loud bang as he was patrolling the area. Moore had backed his pickup truck into a telephone pole approximately one and a half miles away from the crime scene. As Rollins approached the vehicle, he saw Moore sitting in the back of the truck bleeding from the gunshot wound to his left arm. As Rollins shouted at him to surrender, Moore confessed to the crime. The stolen money was found in a bag covered in blood in the front seat of the truck. The weapon that Moore had taken from Mahoney was later found on a nearby highway shortly before dawn. Moore was taken to Spartanburg hospital where he was treated for his injuries. He was then transported to the Spartanburg County jail where he was charged with armed robbery, assault and battery with intent to kill, and murder.

Trial and appeals
Moore was tried for shooting and killing Mahoney in October 2001. He was charged with murder, assault with intent to kill, armed robbery, and a firearms violation. He was found guilty and the jury convicted him of all counts. In a separate sentencing proceeding, the jury recommended a sentence of death. Moore was then formally sentenced to death for the murder of Mahoney on October 22, 2001.

Moore claimed he shot Mahoney in self-defense after Mahoney drew the first gun. His supporters and appellate lawyers have argued that the crime he committed was not a death penalty offense. Moore entered the store unarmed and took the gun from Mahoney, with his lawyers arguing that because he did not bring a weapon into the store, he was therefore not intending to kill someone when he walked in.

Scheduled executions
Following Moore's sentence, he was scheduled for execution on January 22, 2002, by Circuit Judge Gary Clary. Prosecutors acknowledged at the time, however, that it would take years of appeals before Moore would actually be executed.

After running out of appeals, Moore was scheduled to be executed on December 4, 2020. However, the state was unable to execute him as they did not have the lethal injection drugs required to do so. Moore was given the choice to die by either lethal injection or the electric chair. He declined to pick either method, meaning he was set to die by the primary method of lethal injection. As the state did not have the drugs available, his execution was stayed.

Following this, lawmakers in South Carolina pushed to add the option of execution by firing squad, in an attempt to resume executions, after a failure to get the drugs needed for lethal injection. A bill, approved by a 66–43 vote, gave inmates the choice to die by electrocution or firing squad if lethal injection drugs were unavailable. In March 2022, the state announced it had finished developing protocols for executions by firing squad.

Moore was scheduled to be executed on April 29, 2022. On April 15, he chose to be executed by firing squad instead of the electric chair. On April 20, the South Carolina Supreme Court halted the execution and issued a temporary stay. At the time, the South Carolina Supreme Court did not explain why they granted Moore's request for a stay, but said they would elaborate later. Prior, Moore's attorneys had filed litigation challenging whether South Carolina's execution methods, including the electric chair, were unconstitutional or not, as well as whether Moore's sentence was appropriately harsh given the details of the crime; the results of both lawsuits were still pending at the time of Moore's April 29 scheduled execution.

See also
 Capital punishment in South Carolina
 Capital punishment in the United States
 List of death row inmates in the United States
 List of people scheduled to be executed in the United States
 Ronnie Lee Gardner, the last person who was executed by firing squad in the United States

References

Living people
1965 births
20th-century American criminals
American male criminals
American people convicted of murder
Criminals from Michigan
People convicted of murder by South Carolina
Prisoners sentenced to death by South Carolina